Rosenwald is a surname. Notable people with the surname include:
 Cindy Rosenwald (born 1954), American politician
 Harold Rosenwald ( 1908–1990), American lawyer
 James B. Rosenwald (born 1958), American businessman
 Julius Rosenwald (1862–1932), American businessman and philanthropist
 Lessing J. Rosenwald (1891–1979), American businessman and rare book collector
 Laurie Rosenwald (born 1955), American illustrator, author, artist and designer
 Lindsay Rosenwald , American businessman
 Nina Rosenwald, American political activist and philanthropist
 William Rosenwald (1903–1996), American businessman and philanthropist